The Air Balloon was a public house and road junction at Birdlip, Gloucestershire, England and closed in 2022 as part of road improvements. It was on the A417 at a significant congestion point.

Location
The pub was situated next to a roundabout junction with the A417, a major road between Swindon and Gloucester via Cirencester. The A436 meets the A417 at this point; the two roads together form a de facto bypass of Cheltenham between Oxford and Gloucester.

History

The pub opened in 1784 and is probably named after one of the first British balloon flights: the launching of a small hydrogen balloon by Edward Jenner on 2 September 1784, which flew from Berkeley Castle to Kingscote and then on to a field near Birdlip, the year after the pioneering flights of the Montgolfier brothers' hot air balloon and Jacques Charles's hydrogen balloon in Paris. It was known as the Balloon by 1796 and renamed the Air Balloon in 1802. By 1856, the landlord was brewing beer on-site. The premises were part of the Cowley Manor Estate until some time early in the twentieth century. The pub was bought by Greene King in 2004. In 2020 the menu included burgers, steaks, vegetarian food, "pub classics" and a lunchtime carvery.

Closure
The pub has been under threat of demolition as it sits alongside a short section of single-carriageway road which is otherwise a high-quality route between the M4 and M5 motorways. Although the junction has been said to be a notorious accident blackspot; from 1999 to 2014 there were an estimated 340 casualties along the whole section of road 

In March 2019, Highways England proposed improvements that would include demolition of the pub. Highways England has ruled out a junction at the Air Balloon as the local geography and steep hills nearby would make it impossible to build a high-quality road meeting modern safety standards. The road could not be routed anywhere else as it would cut through Barrow Wake, which is a Site of Special Scientific Interest. Highways England stated that it would talk to landowners and assess the social impact of the pub's demolition in a further design stage. As of June 2021, the pub was open, but still expected to be demolished. The landlord subsequently announced in December 2022 that the pub would close on New Year's Eve, and then it will be demolished.

Actor John Challis' widow said the couple used to visit the pub regularly, and she was sad to see it close.

Future
A spokesperson for Highways England expressed surprise at the pub's closure, saying it could have stayed open longer. There are additional concerns that a now-closed prominent landmark could become a magnet for vandalism.

References
Citations

Sources

External links

 

Pubs in Gloucestershire
Roundabouts in England
Road junctions in England
Buildings and structures demolished in 2023